Gregory Finley (born December 22, 1984) is an American actor, best known for his role as Jack Pappas in the teenage drama series The Secret Life of the American Teenager as well as Drake in the series Star Crossed and iZombie, and Girder in The Flash.

Career
Greg Finley is best known for his role as Jack Pappas, on The Secret Life Of The American Teenager. In February 2010, Finley was cast in the Dark Sky Films thriller Hypothermia, directed by James Felix McKenney.

Personal life 

Finley was raised in Scarborough, Maine, a coastal town seven miles south of Portland. His father is part-owner of the Dry Dock pub and restaurant on Portland's waterfront. After high school, Finley enrolled in a restaurant management program at Johnson & Wales University in Rhode Island, but his academics suffered due to a large abscess in his throat. Finley required emergency treatment and lost about 60 pounds in the process. In order to cope, Finley watched movies and through this hardship, he decided to become an actor and at age 19 moved to Los Angeles.

Filmography

References

External links
 Verified Instagram
 

Male actors from Portland, Maine
Male actors from Maine
American male television actors
Living people
People from Scarborough, Maine
1984 births